The Norris Cup was a trophy awarded by the Norris Candy Company to the best all around athlete at several North Carolina colleges. Jack McDowall won it twice.

List of trophy winners
The following is a list of winners.

See also
 Porter Cup

References

College football awards